Philippine Medical Association is the primary medical association of the Philippines, covering medical practitioners and component medical groups from the entire country.

It is a member of the World Medical Association and is a co-founder of the Confederation of Medical Associations of Asia and Oceania. It is also the co-founder of Medical Associations of South East Asian Nations.

See also
Philippine College of Physicians
Philippine Academy of Family Physicians, Inc.

References

External links
 official website

Non-profit organizations based in the Philippines
Medical and health organizations based in the Philippines
Professional associations based in the Philippines